The Young Liberals of Switzerland, abbreviated to YLS, is the youth wing of FDP.The Liberals.  It was founded in 1906 and, with more than 4,400 members aged between 15 and 35.

About
The Young Liberals of Switzerland (YLS) are active on the federal, the Cantonal, the local level and at universities in Switzerland. The party has four members of the federal National Council, Christian Wasserfallen, Andri Silberschmidt, Philippe Nantermod, Christa Markwalder and one of the Council of States, Johanna Gapany. The party also holds several seats in Cantonal and local parliaments.

Although the YLS is independent, it is affiliated with the Free Democratic Party of Switzerland and, on the international level, with European Liberal Youth as well as International Federation of Liberal Youth.

Principles 
The Young Liberals stands for more freedom in daily life and fights against bureaucracy and unnecessary bans.  
The Young Liberals commit themselves for an excellent education, secure social security within a sustainable social welfare system, a strong economy- based on free market principles -especially for small and medium business, security and a sustainable environment.

Organisation 
The sovereign body of the Young Liberals is called "The Congress", and meets once a year, usually in spring. The Congress elects the members of the National Board and decides upon political strategy papers, which altogether form the manifesto. 
During the year, the Council of Delegates meets four times and decides on current business, e.g. adopts the positions of the party on popular votes and referendums. The Young Liberals organized a referendum against fixed book prices and won the public vote. 
The National Board is responsible for the daily business and coordination with the cantonal sections.

National Board
The current members of the National Board (as of July 2020):

 President: Mattias Müller (ZH)
 Vice president: Jill Nussbaumer (ZG)
 Vice president: Alec von Barnekow (FR)
 Treasurer: Michael Umbricht (AG)
 International Officer: Philipp Eng (SO)
 Political Planning: Thomas Juch (BE)
 Responsible for Cantonal Sections: Fabian Kuhn (FR)
 Webmaster: Jonas Lüthy (BS)
 Creative director: Roger Huber (ZH)

External links 
jungfreisinnige schweiz official site (in German/French/English)
Free Democratic Party FDP official site (in German)
Free Democratic Party official site (in French)
Liberal European Youth official site of LYMEC (in English)
Federation of International Liberal Youth official site of IFLRY (in English)

FDP.The Liberals
Youth wings of political parties in Switzerland